Sumday is the third studio album by American indie rock band Grandaddy, released on May 13, 2003 by record label V2.

The album achieved commercial success in the UK, and was well received by music critics.

Content 

Around about the time of the album's release, frontman Jason Lytle commented that the album "represents the closest I've been to singing in the first person, writing passionately".

Release 

Sumday was released on May 13, 2003 by record label V2.

The album is the group's highest charting in the UK, peaking at No. 22. By 2006, the album had sold 110,000 copies.

An expanded version of the album was released five months later, with a bonus disc of songs recorded live at the Glastonbury Festival in 2003 (tracks 1–6) as well as three tracks taken from The Black Sessions in Paris (tracks 7–9).

Singles 

Three singles were released from the album: "El Caminos in the West", which reached No. 48 on the UK Singles Chart; "Now It's On", which reached No. 23; and "I'm on Standby".

Critical reception 

The album was well received by music critics.

PopMatters viewed the album as one where Lytle had decided to "tone down on the experimentation, and concentrate on developing some terrific melodies", calling it "really the next logical step for the band". He commented on similarities to the Alan Parsons Project ("Now It's On"), ELO ("The Go in the Go-for-It") and John Lennon ("Lost on Yer Merry Way"), and noted an improvement in Lytle's songwriting. The CMJ New Music Report made it their 'essential release' in May 2003, calling it a "genuinely wholehearted work", and in their end-of-year review placed it at No. 7 in their list of the top albums of the year. Jim DeRogatis, in his book Turn on Your Mind: Four Decades of Great Psychedelic Rock, viewed the melodies as "even more effervescent and more memorable" than on The Sophtware Slump. Sophie Best of The Age called it "another sprawling sonic Grandaddy adventure, shimmering with wistful sincerity and rural-tinged psychedelia". NME gave it a grade of 8/10, writing that the songs sound "pretty much like Neil Young if he'd heard an Aphex Twin record". Robert Christgau of The Village Voice gave the album a one-star honorable mention rating and cited "The Group Who Couldn't Say" and "Stray Dog and the Chocolate Shake" as highlights.

A less favourable review came from Heather Phares of AllMusic, who described the record as being "bland and complacent", opining that it failed to live up to the expectations of The Sophtware Slump.

Track listing

Personnel 
 Grandaddy

 Jason Lytle – lead vocals, guitar, various instruments, production, engineering
 Kevin Garcia – bass guitar
 Aaron Burtch – drums
 Jim Fairchild – guitar
 Tim Dryden – keyboards

 Technical

 Lucky Lew – engineering
 Michael H. Brauer – mixing
 Nathaniel Chan – mixing assistance
 Rick Chavarria – mixing assistance
 Greg Calbi – mastering
 Shinzou Maeda – cover photography

References

External links 

 

Grandaddy albums
2003 albums
V2 Records albums